Axinaea quitensis is a species of plant in the family Melastomataceae. It is endemic to Ecuador. Its natural habitats are subtropical or tropical moist montane forests and subtropical or tropical high-altitude shrubland.

References

Endemic flora of Ecuador
quitensis
Near threatened plants
Taxonomy articles created by Polbot
Plants described in 1934